The Sürgü Fault Zone (Sürgü Fay Zonu) is a major fault zone in south-central Anatolia. It contains the Sürgü fault. Rupture on this fault caused the second major (M>7) earthquake during the 2023 Gaziantep-Kahramanmaraş earthquakes that started in February 2023.

The fault zone extends (west to east) from Göksun to Çelikhan where it merges into the East Anatolian Fault.
It is a "major fault recognized in the field" of geosciences and "was known to be capable of very significant earthquakes" such as in 1544 and 1986.

During the 2023 Gaziantep-Kahramanmaraş earthquakes, the Sürgü Fault experienced a major earthquake of 7.6, which was followed by many aftershocks along the active length of the faultline.

References

Sources
 

Strike-slip faults
Seismic faults of Turkey